The following tables list smart cards used for public transport and other electronic purse applications.

Africa

Americas

Asia and Oceania

Europe

See also 
 Smartcards on buses and trams in Great Britain
 Smartcards on National Rail (Great Britain)

References

Public transport fare collection
Lists of brands
Technology-related lists
Transport lists